The Boggit: Bored Too is a text adventure game by Delta 4 released in 1986 for the Commodore 64, Amstrad CPC, and ZX Spectrum home computers. The game is a parody of the J. R. R. Tolkien novel The Hobbit and of the earlier game based upon it also called The Hobbit. It is the prequel to Bored of the Rings.

Plot 
Bimbo Faggins and Grandalf must find treasure, solve puzzles, and appear on a gameshow.

Gameplay 
The game is in 3 separate parts which are each loaded separately. Commands are entered in either full sentences or using a verb / noun format. Conversations with other characters in the game are possible.

The player can also save and load a game position in computer memory.

Reviews 
Sinclair User magazine wrote that The Boggit was "just as funny and sick as its predecessor but is better presented and a whole lot snappier. It's miles better than the game it lampoons too."

See also 
Kingdom O' Magic, another fantasy parody game by the same designer

References

External links 
 
 The Boggit at Gamebase 64
 

1980s interactive fiction
1986 video games
Amstrad CPC games
Commodore 64 games
CRL Group games
Middle-earth parodies
Parody video games
Single-player video games
Video games based on Middle-earth
Video games developed in the United Kingdom
ZX Spectrum games